The County of Lowan is one of the 37 counties of Victoria which are part of the cadastral divisions of Australia, used for land titles. The northern boundary of the county is at 36°S. Larger towns include Dimboola, Edenhope and Kaniva. The county was proclaimed in 1871 together with the other counties of the Wimmera Land District.

Parishes 
Parishes within the county:
Apsley                     *Arapiles
Awonga
Babatchio
Balrootan  
Bambadin 
Banu Bonyit
Beewar  
Benayeo 
Berontha 
Bogalara part in the County of Follett
Boikerbert 
Booroopki
Bringalbart 
Carchap
Catiabrim  
Charam 
Connangorach   
Connewirrecoo  
Cooack  
Coynallan
Curtayne 
Daahl  
Dahwedarre  
Darragan
Dimboola part in the County of Borung
Ding-a-ding 
Dinyarrak  
Dollin part in the County of Borung
Dopewora  
Duchembegarra
Durndal 
Durong    
Edenhope 
Gerang Gerung
Goroke  
Gymbowen  
Harrow 
Jallakin  
Jilpanger  
Jungkum 
Kadnook  
Kalingur
Kaniva 
Karnak 
Kiata 
Kinimakatka
Konnepra
Koonik Koonik 
Kout Narin
Lawloit  
Leeor  
Lillimur
Lorquon  
Lowan 
Meereek
Minimay 
Mirampiram
Mockinya part in the County of Borung
Moray  
Morea  
Mortat 
Murrandarra 
Murrawong 
Nateyip  
Natimuk  
Neuarpur
Ni Ni  
Nurcoung  
Nurrabiel
Peechember  
Pengana 
Perenna  
Pomponderoo
Propodollah
Spinifex
Tallageira
Tarranginnie 
Telangatuk  
Tooan 
Toolondo  
Toolongrook  
Toonambool 
Tullyvea  
Turandurey  
Tyar  
Warraquil
Watchegatcheca
Winiam 
Wombelano 
Woorak
Woraigworm
Wytwarrone 
Yallakar 
Yanac-a-yanac
Yanipy
Yarrangook 
Yarrock 
Yat Nat
Yearinga 
Zenobia

References

Research aids, Victoria 1910

Counties of Victoria (Australia)